Vysokovo is a rural locality (a village) in Korobitsynskoye Rural Settlement, Syamzhensky District, Vologda Oblast, Russia. The population was 20 as of 2002.

Geography 
Vysokovo is located 40 km east of Syamzha (the district's administrative centre) by road. Pestino is the nearest rural locality.

References 

Rural localities in Syamzhensky District